

Soviet Union

Ukrainian competitions

References

 
Zorya Luhansk
Seasons